Niisato may refer to two villages, both of which have been merged with neighboring towns:
 Niisato, Gunma
 Niisato, Iwate